Heinrich Klaasen (born 30 July 1991) is a South African cricketer who plays for the South African national cricket team. He was included in the Northerns cricket team for the 2015 Africa T20 Cup. In February 2021, Klaasen captained South Africa for the first time in a T20I match.

Domestic and T20 career
In August 2017, Klaasen was named in Nelson Mandela Bay Stars' squad for the first season of the T20 Global League. However, in October 2017, Cricket South Africa initially postponed the tournament until November 2018, with it being cancelled soon after.

On 2 April 2018, Klaasen joined the Indian Premier League side Rajasthan Royals replacing Steve Smith.

In June 2018, Klaasen was named in the squad for the Titans team for the 2018–19 season. In October 2018, he was named in Durban Heat's squad for the first edition of the Mzansi Super League T20 tournament.

In December 2018, Klaasen was bought by the Royal Challengers Bangalore in the player auction for the 2019 Indian Premier League. In June 2019, he was selected to play for the Toronto Nationals franchise team in the 2019 Global T20 Canada tournament. In July 2019, he was selected to play for the Glasgow Giants in the inaugural edition of the Euro T20 Slam cricket tournament. However, the following month the tournament was cancelled.

In September 2019, Klaasen was named in the squad for the Tshwane Spartans team for the 2019 Mzansi Super League tournament. He was released by the Royal Challengers Bangalore ahead of the 2020 IPL auction.

Shukri Conrad, a coach at Cricket South Africa's National Academy, stated that Klaasen could become South Africa's equivalent of MS Dhoni. In September 2015, he said, "Heinrich stays very calm in the situation. He stays in the moment. There’s very much a ‘poor man’s MS Dhoni’ about him. There are really no sideshows to his game and really takes the game to the opposition. He doesn't wait for the game to come to him and that is what I like most about him. He is as tough as they come."

In April 2021, Klaasen was named in Northerns' squad, ahead of the 2021–22 cricket season in South Africa.

He was bought by Sunrisers Hyderabad to play in the 2023 Indian Premier League.

On February 5, 2023, Klaasen scored the second century in SA20 history, scoring 104* off 44 balls while batting for Durban's Super Giants in a match against the Pretoria Capitals

International career
In February 2017, Klaasen was named in South Africa's Test squad for their series against New Zealand, but did not play.

In February 2018, Klaasen was added to South Africa's One Day International (ODI) squad for their series against India, replacing an injured Quinton de Kock. He made his ODI debut against India on 7 February 2018. He won his first international man of the match award in his second ODI, in the fourth ODI of the home series against India, with a match-winning 43 runs off 27 balls.

In the same month, Klaasen was named in the South Africa Twenty20 International (T20I) squad, also for their series against India. He made his T20I debut for South Africa against India on 18 February 2018. On 21 February, Klaasen scored his maiden T20I fifty in the second T20I against India which South Africa won by 6 wickets, he was also awarded the man of the match for his 69 runs from 30 balls, which included 3 fours and 7 sixes.

In February 2018, Klaasen was named in South Africa's Test squad for their series against Australia, but did not play. In August 2019, he was added to South Africa's Test squad for their series against India, replacing the injured Rudi Second. He made his Test debut for South Africa, against India, on 19 October 2019. On 29 February 2020, Klaasen scored his first century in an ODI match, making an unbeaten 123 against Australia.

In January 2021, Klaasen was named to captain the South Africa T20I squad for their away series against Pakistan. In April 2021, Klaasen was again named as South Africa's T20I captain, this time for their home series against Pakistan, after Temba Bavuma was ruled out due to an injury. In September 2021, Klaasen was named in the South Africa squad for the 2021 ICC Men's T20 World Cup.

References

External links
 

1991 births
Living people
South African cricketers
South Africa Test cricketers
South Africa One Day International cricketers
South Africa Twenty20 International cricketers
Durban Heat cricketers
Durban's Super Giants cricketers
Northerns cricketers
Cricketers from Pretoria
Rajasthan Royals cricketers
Royal Challengers Bangalore cricketers
Tshwane Spartans cricketers
Wicket-keepers